Marabana is the name of the most popular marathon in Cuba. Since 1987 the Marabana has been held in Havana, Cuba, during the month of November (third Sunday of November). It contains both a half marathon and a marathon in a circuit around the most central avenues in Havana, starting and finishing in Old Havana. Both circuits are certified by the AIMS/IASF.  The half marathon is 21 km and 97.50 m, while the marathon is 42 km and 195 m.

Technical specifications
Some specifications of the marathon are the following:

Three different races are held:
 Marathon: 42 195 meters
 Half marathon: 21 097.50 meters
 Mini-marathon por la paz: 4 219 meters

Limit Time:
 Marathon 5 hours
 Half marathon 3 hours

Supply stations are found every 2 kilometers and first aid stations are found every 3 kilometers.

Records

Marathon

 Men- 2:13:37
 Women- 2.43:40

Half marathon:

 Men- 1.03:40
 Women- 1.14:56

Subscription Fee
 50 Cuban Convertible Pesos (Approx. 50 USD)

Winners of the Half Marathon

Winners Marathon

See also
Marathon articles
Marathon
Half marathon
List of marathon races in North America
Marathon world record progression
Ultramarathon

Cuban runners
Alberto Cuba
Emperatriz Wilson
Aguelmis Rojas
Mariela González

References

External links
 Official Site of Marabana

Marathons in Cuba
Sport in Havana
Recurring sporting events established in 1987
Autumn events in Cuba